Barcelona Zoo (Parc Zoològic de Barcelona in Catalan, Parque Zoológico de Barcelona in Spanish) is a zoo in the Parc de la Ciutadella in Barcelona, Catalonia, Spain. The zoo used to be internationally known as the home of Snowflake, the only known albino gorilla, who died in 2003.

Animals
Terrarium: Opened in 1972, the Barcelona Zoo's terrarium has one of the largest reptile and amphibian collections in Europe.
Aviarium: The aviary was constructed in the 1970s and renovated in 2002. It houses 70 species of birds from all over the world.
Palmeral: Located by the zoo entrance, the Palmeral consists of thirteen aviaries with different species of macaws and cockatoos. The aviaries are made out of either colourful wooden huts or galvanised steel tube and mesh.
Marmoset Gallery: Constructed in 1990, the Marmoset Gallery consists of indoor and outdoor enclosures for 7 species of marmosets and tamarins.
Sahel Savannah: A new complex was constructed in 2018 to improve the habitats for the zoo's African animals like giraffes, lions and African elephants. Vegetation from the Sahel region such as acacias, grasses and euphorbias are planted in the complex to recreate the habitat.

Mammals

African bush elephant
African forest buffalo
Bactrian camel
Banded mongoose
Barbary macaque
Barbary sheep
Black howler monkey
Black-tailed prairie dog
Blue wildebeest
Bornean orangutan
Brazilian tapir
California sea lion
Capybara
Chapman's zebra
Chimpanzee
Chital
Common patas monkey
Common warthog
Cotton-top tamarin
Crested porcupine
De Brazza's monkey
Dorcas gazelle
Drill
Eastern bongo
Emperor tamarin
Eurasian brown bear
Eurasian otter
European bison
European mouflon
Gabon talapoin
Giant anteater
Golden-headed lion tamarin
Goeldi's monkey
Guanaco
Hippopotamus
Iberian wolf
Impala
Indian muntjac
Jaguar
Lion
Lyle's flying fox
Meerkat
Mhorr gazelle
Pileated gibbon
Pygmy hippopotamus
Pygmy marmoset
Red-handed tamarin
Red kangaroo
Red-capped mangabey
Red-necked wallaby
Red panda
Ring-tailed lemur
Rothschild's giraffe
Scimitar oryx
Silvery marmoset
Southern white rhinoceros
Spotted hyena
Sri Lankan leopard
Sumatran tiger
Variegated spider monkey
Western lowland gorilla
White-naped mangabey

Birds

African sacred ibis
Amazonian motmot
American flamingo
Black crowned crane
Black-crowned night heron
Black-naped fruit dove
Black-necked swan
Blacksmith lapwing
Black-winged stilt
Blue-and-yellow macaw
Blue-breasted kingfisher
Blue-throated macaw
Chilean flamingo
Cinereous vulture
Collared kingfisher
Common shelduck
Crested partridge
Crested screamer
Dalmatian pelican
Egyptian vulture
Eurasian griffon vulture
Eurasian scops owl
Eurasian spoonbill
European roller
Glossy ibis
Great curassow
Grey-winged trumpeter
Guinea turaco
Humboldt penguin
Hyacinth macaw
Inca jay
Indian peafowl
Laughing kookaburra
Lesser grey shrike
Lesser sulphur-crested cockatoo
Little bittern
Little egret
Luzon bleeding-heart
Marbled duck
Mindanao bleeding-heart
Nicobar pigeon
Northern bald ibis
Palawan peacock-pheasant
Pheasant pigeon
Pied avocet
Pied crow
Pied imperial pigeon
Red-and-green macaw
Red-crested turaco
Red-fronted macaw
Rosy-billed pochard
Saddle-billed stork
Scarlet ibis
Silvery-cheeked hornbill
Southern ground hornbill
Spangled cotinga
Speckled mousebird
Spectacled owl
Striated heron
Sunbittern
Superb fruit dove
Triton cockatoo
Wattled jacana
Western crowned pigeon
Western plantain-eater
Western swamphen
White cockatoo
White stork
Victoria crowned pigeon
Violet turaco

Reptiles and amphibians

African spurred tortoise
Aldabra giant tortoise
Black marsh turtle
Broad-snouted caiman
Chinese alligator
Dumeril's boa
Dwarf crocodile
Galápagos tortoise
Gila monster
Green anaconda
Hermann's tortoise
Indian python
Komodo dragon
Majorcan midwife toad
Montseny brook newt
Rhinoceros iguana
Siamese crocodile
Yacare caiman

Incidents
On 8 December 2014, a 45-year-old man jumped into the lion enclosure. He was bitten and scratched, but was rescued and eventually recovered from the injuries.

On 8 December 2020, four lions at the zoo tested positive for COVID-19.

Notes

External links 

Nature conservation in Catalonia
Zoos in Spain
Buildings and structures in Barcelona
Tourist attractions in Barcelona
Zoos established in 1892